Srish Kumar Nandy (10 October 1897 – 23 February 1952) was the last zamindar of Cossimbazar Raj and a writer, politician and landlord of Bengal.

He was eldest son of Sir Maharaja Manindra Chandra Nandy and Maharani Kashishwari

He waselected as an independent candidate in the 1936 Bengal elections and then served as a minister in Government of Bengal in charge of Irrigation, Communications and Works for the years 1936–1941 in the Cabinet of Aq Fazlul Huq cabinet. In 1924, he became a member of Bengal Legislative Council. He was initially associated with Hindu Mahasabha but later joined Congress.

He was the author of books - Bengal Rivers and Our Economic Welfare, Flood and Its Remedy, Monopathy (a pathological study of mind) - a comic drama, Dasyu Duhita (Robber's daughter) - a five act drama.

The Maharaja Manindra Chandra College stands as a memorial, founded by him in memory of his father.

Later, he founded and funded another institution, which is now known as Maharaja Srish Chandra College.

References

1897 births
1952 deaths
Indian philanthropists
Founders of Indian schools and colleges
Bengali zamindars
Bengali educators
Bengali writers
Bengali Hindus
19th-century Bengalis
20th-century Bengalis
Indian writers
Indian male writers
19th-century Indian writers
20th-century Indian writers
19th-century Indian male writers
20th-century Indian male writers
Indian non-fiction writers
20th-century Indian non-fiction writers
19th-century Indian non-fiction writers
Indian educators
20th-century Indian educators
19th-century Indian educators
Educationists from India
Educators from West Bengal
People from Murshidabad district
Indian National Congress politicians
Hindu Mahasabha members
Indian landlords
West Bengal politicians